Eighteen or 18 may refer to:

 18 (number), the natural number following 17 and preceding 19
 one of the years 18 BC, AD 18, 1918, 2018

Film, television and entertainment
 18 (film), a 1993 Taiwanese experimental film based on the short story God's Dice
 Eighteen (film), a 2005 Canadian dramatic feature film
 18 (British Board of Film Classification), a film rating in the United Kingdom, also used in Ireland by the Irish Film Classification Office
 18 (Dragon Ball), a character in the Dragon Ball franchise
 "Eighteen", a 2006 episode of the animated television series 12 oz. Mouse

Music

Albums
 18 (Moby album), 2002
 18 (Nana Kitade album), 2005
 18..., 2009 debut album by G.E.M.
 18 (Jeff Beck and Johnny Depp album), 2022

Songs
 "18" (5 Seconds of Summer song), from their 2014 eponymous debut album
 "18" (One Direction song), from their 2014 studio album Four
 "18", by Anarbor from their 2013 studio album Burnout
 "I'm Eighteen", by Alice Cooper commonly referred to as simply "Eighteen", 1970
 "Eighteen" (CLC song), 2015
 "Eighteen" (Pale Waves song), 2018
 "Eighteen", by Connie Francis, 1957
 "Eighteen", by ¡Forward, Russia!, 2006
 "Eighteen", by Patricia Cahill, B-side to "Colm Bán", 1971

See also

 
 
 18 rating (disambiguation)
 018 (disambiguation) (zero-one-eight)
 o18 (disambiguation) (o-one-eight)